DJGCC (DJ's GNU Compiler Collection ) is a C development suite for x86 PCs that runs under DOS or compatibles. It is guided by DJ Delorie, who started the project in 1989. It is a port of the popular gcc compiler.

See also

 DJGPP - C++ version
 EMX - a POSIX implementation for DOS (and OS/2, too)
 Cygwin - a UNIX compatibility layer with many ported libraries and applications
 MinGW - a port of the GNU toolchain for Windows, designed to require minimal runtime support
 GnuWin32

References

External links
 DJGPP website
 DJ Delorie's webpage

C (programming language) compilers
DOS extenders
Free compilers and interpreters
Free integrated development environments